Fairbanks is an unincorporated community in Ouachita Parish, Louisiana, United States. Fairbanks has a post office with ZIP code 71240.

References

Unincorporated communities in Ouachita Parish, Louisiana
Unincorporated communities in Louisiana